Below are the results for season 19 (2021) of the World Poker Tour. There are ten scheduled events, including three online events to be held on partypoker. Two events were cancelled during the season; WPT bestbet Scramble and WPT Maryland at Live! Casino.

Events

Source:

WPT Online Series  

 Casino: Online (partypoker)
 Buy-in: $3,200
 6-Day Event: May 23-June 2, 2021
 Number of Entries: 1,065
 Total Prize Pool: $3,195,000
 Number of Payouts: 158

Seminole Hard Rock Tampa  

 Casino: Seminole Hard Rock Hotel and Casino, Tampa, Florida
 Buy-in: $3,500
 5-Day Event: June 18-22, 2021
 Number of Entries: 1,165
 Total Prize Pool: $3,728,000
 Number of Payouts: 146

WPT Venetian  

 Casino: The Venetian, Las Vegas, Nevada
 Buy-in: $5,000
 6-Day Event: July 2-7, 2021
 Number of Entries: 1,199
 Total Prize Pool: $5,545,375
 Number of Payouts: 150
 Note: Three women made the final table for the first time in WPT history

WPT Choctaw  

 Casino: Choctaw Casino & Resort, Durant, Oklahoma
 Buy-in: $3,700
 5-Day Event: July 23-27, 2021
 Number of Entries:  964
 Total Prize Pool:  3,272,780
 Number of Payouts:  122

WPT World Online Championships  

 Casino: Online (partypoker)
 Buy-in:  $5,300
 3-Day Event:  August 29 - September 14, 2022
 Number of Entries:  1,179
 Total Prize Pool:  $5,895,000
 Number of Payouts:  178

WPT Online Borgata Poker Open  

 Casino: Online (partypoker US Network)
 Buy-in: $3,500
 5-Day Event: September 19-21, 2021
 Number of Entries:  305
 Total Prize Pool:  $1,000,000
 Number of Payouts:  48
 Note: Online screen names are in the place where real names are not available to the public

Seminole Rock 'N' Roll Poker Open  

 Casino: Seminole Hard Rock Hotel & Casino, Hollywood, Florida
 Buy-in: $3,500
 5-Day Event: November 26-30, 2021
 Number of Entries:  1,566
 Total Prize Pool:  $5,011,200
 Number of Payouts:  196

Five Diamond World Poker Classic  

 Casino: Bellagio Resort & Casino, Las Vegas, Nevada
 Buy-in: $10,400
 5-Day Event: December 15-19, 2021
 Number of Entries:  716
 Total Prize Pool:  $6,945,200
 Number of Payouts:  90
 Note: This was the second time Mohsin Charania reached the Five Diamond World Poker Classic final table (1st in Season 13)

External links
Official site

References

World Poker Tour
2021 in poker